Jan Nilsen (6 August 1937 – 3 September 2016) was a Norwegian footballer who played as a wing half for Lisleby, Fredrikstad, and the national team.

Nilsen played one match for Norway's national team, coming on as a substitute for Arne Legernes in a friendly against Iceland on 9 June 1960.

References

External links
 

1937 births
2016 deaths
Norwegian footballers
Lisleby FK players
Fredrikstad FK players
Norwegian First Division players
Eliteserien players
Association football wing halves
Norway international footballers